Lists of pejorative terms for people include:

 List of ethnic slurs
 List of ethnic slurs and epithets by ethnicity
 List of common nouns derived from ethnic group names
 List of religious slurs
 A list of LGBT slang, including LGBT-related slurs
 List of disability-related terms with negative connotations

See also
 Insult
 Dysphemism
 Lists of nicknames
 List of phrases using ethnic or place names as derisive adjectives